Chahar Bisheh (also Romanized as Chahār Bīsheh; also known as Cham Bīshar) is a village in Mishan Rural District, Mahvarmilani District, Mamasani County, Fars Province, Iran. At the 2006 census, its population was 67, in 15 families.

References 

Populated places in Mamasani County